Heathwood Hall Episcopal School is an independent coeducational college preparatory school in Columbia, South Carolina. Founded in 1951, Heathwood offers classes for students in pre-kindergarten/nursery school through grade 12. For the 2006-2007 school year, Heathwood had 1050 students enrolled and graduating classes typically number between 75-85 students each year.

History
Heathwood was chartered in 1951 by the Episcopal Diocese of Upper South Carolina. In 1953, two additional grade levels, 5th and 6th, were added, allowing enrollment to surpass 200.

The school admitted its first black students in 1965.

The school remained on its downtown campus until 1974. Under headmaster Earl Devanny the school relocated to its present site: a  tract of land in southeast Columbia donated by Burwell D. Manning, Jr. The school's first major capital campaign raised $1 million for construction of classrooms, gymnasium and a new high school.  Heathwood Hall graduated its first high school class in 1977. With its proximity to the state capital, it is the choice for many state politicians, including former South Carolina Governors Mark Sanford and Nikki Haley.

In 2017, the school refused a parent access to the campus for the Confederate flag on his truck. The man withdrew his two children from the school.

Governance and Classification
Heathwood Hall Episcopal School is a 501(c)(3) not-for-profit organization as defined by the IRS. It is governed by a voluntary Board of Trustees.

Athletics

The Heathwood Hall Highlanders are members of the South Carolina Independent School Association (SCISA) league. Heathwood is a Class 3A school, the largest classification in SCISA's rankings. Heathwood's varsity football team, currently led by Head Coach Danny Lewis, won SCISA championships in 1986, 2001 and 2004. The women's and men's track teams won SCISA championships respectively in 2005 and 2006. In 2007, the women's golf team won their first SCISA championship and in 2011, the men's basketball team won its first ever SCISA State Championship.

Academics

Heathwood is the only independent school in the state with three National Blue Ribbon School awards from the US Department of Education.

Notable alumni

Monique Coleman – Actor in High School Musical
A'ja Wilson – WNBA player, Las Vegas Aces
Manish Dayal – Actor
James E. Smith Jr. – state representative, candidate for Governor in 2018

References

Private high schools in South Carolina
Schools in Columbia, South Carolina
Educational institutions established in 1951
1951 establishments in South Carolina
Episcopal schools in the United States
Private middle schools in South Carolina
Private elementary schools in South Carolina
Preparatory schools in South Carolina